is a railway station in the city of Minamisōma, Fukushima, Japan, operated by East Japan Railway Company (JR East).

Lines

Station layout
The station has a side platform and an island platform connected to the station building by a footbridge. The station has a Midori no Madoguchi staffed ticket counter.

Platforms

History

Haranomachi Station opened on 3 April 1898. With the privatization of Japanese National Railways (JNR) on 1 April 1987, the station came under the control of JR East.

Train services from the station were suspended following the 2011 Tōhoku earthquake and tsunami on 11 March 2011.

In March 2016, the two trains, a four-car 651 series (Super Hitachi) EMU and a 415-1500 series EMU, stranded at the station since the March 2011 tsunami, were removed by road for scrapping.

Passenger statistics
In fiscal 2018, the station was used by an average of 1024 passengers daily (boarding passengers only). The passenger figures for previous years are as shown below.

Surrounding area
 former Haramachi City Hall
 Haramachi Post Office

Road Station Minamisoma

See also
 List of railway stations in Japan

References

External links

  

Railway stations in Fukushima Prefecture
Jōban Line
Railway stations in Japan opened in 1898
Stations of East Japan Railway Company
Minamisōma